J. Edward Roush Lake is a reservoir in Huntington, Indiana, United States.

The Huntington Reservoir was renamed J. Edward Roush Lake to honor the impact to the local area of J. Edward Roush, who served as a State Representative and State Senator in Indiana and a representative in the U.S. House of Representatives.

The J. Edward Roush Lake Dam was completed in 1968 for flood control and recreation.

The Indiana Department of Natural Resources (DNR), in partnership with the U.S. Army Corps of Engineers, manages public land at Roush Lake, along with that of seven other lakes in the state, including nearby Salamonie and Mississinewa lakes. The latter two, along with Roush, are known as the Upper Wabash Reservoirs. Under a lease with the Corps, the DNR operates and maintains the recreational facilities and wildlife areas at these properties. The Corps manages the dams and some recreational facilities immediately around the dams. The Corps also monitors and controls lake water levels.

Activities allowed at the lake include boating, camping, fishing, hunting, picnicking, and water sports.

See also
 J.E. Roush Fish and Wildlife Area

References

External links

http://www.in.gov/portal/news_events/56426.htm 
http://www.IN.gov/dnr/fishwild/6358.htm  

Reservoirs in Indiana
Protected areas of Huntington County, Indiana
Bodies of water of Huntington County, Indiana